Petropavlovsk-Kamchatsky Air Flight 251 (PTK251) was a domestic Russian scheduled passenger flight from Petropavlovsk-Kamchatsky to Palana, both in Kamchatka Krai in the Russian Far East. On 6 July 2021, the Antonov An-26 serving the flight crashed on approach to Palana, killing all 28 passengers and crew on board.

Background
The accident aircraft was an Antonov An-26B-100, registration RA-26085,  12310, belonging to Kamchatka Air Enterprise. It was built and first flew as an An-26B in 1982. The An-26 is a family of military transport aircraft, however the aircraft involved, RA-26085, was a version that an October 2012 overhaul had converted to civilian use for transporting passengers and cargo. It is a twin-engined turboprop powered by two Ivchenko AI-24VT engines. The aircraft had previously operated with PermTransAvia and Air Mali International, and was also leased for United Nations use.  The aircraft had been operated by Petropavlovsk-Kamchatsky Air Enterprise since 2013. It made an average of about nine flights a week, with each flight about two hours.

The aircraft had six crew, including captain, first officer, navigator and flight engineer.
In 2012, an Antonov An-28 assigned to the same flight route and number also crashed while on its approach to land at Palana Airport.

Accident

Flight 251 was a domestic scheduled passenger flight from Elizovo Airport, Petropavlovsk-Kamchatsky to Palana Airport, Palana, Russia. The flight departed from Petropavlovsk-Kamchatsky at 12:57 local time (00:57 UTC) and was due to land at Palana at 15:05 local time (03:05 UTC). The aircraft passed safely through the area control centers and at 14:09 was transferred to the ATC of Tigilsky District, where the captain contacted Palana for information on weather conditions. Upon receiving the weather information, the captain was given "clear coordinates of the route" during the final approach. The last contact with the aircraft was at 14:50 local time (02:50 UTC).

No go-around was reported by ATC. The weather in the area was cloudy. Upon impact, the aircraft was completely destroyed. Only a portion of the plane's tail remained on the cliff after the impact; the rest of the debris slid down the cliff and into the Sea of Okhotsk, leaving only a skid mark on the cliff to indicate where the accident had taken place.

Response
The crash site was found on the same day, after the Russian Ministry of Emergency Situations had dispatched a Mil Mi-8 helicopter and deployed search teams on the ground. A weak signal was received from an emergency locator transmitter (ELT). Wreckage was sighted at 21:00 local time (09:00 UTC). The aircraft debris were fragmented. A fuselage fragment was found on the slope of the Pyatibratka hill and another fragment was located in the sea,  from the coast. All 28 people on board died.

By 7 July the bodies of 19 victims had been recovered by a team of 51 rescue workers. Due to the geographic features of the landscape, the search and rescue operations were deemed difficult. High waves forced rescuers to suspend operations in the sea during the night. A three-day mourning period was declared in the region. Several countries expressed condolences, including the United States, Greece, Turkey, Serbia and Pakistan.

Investigation
The Interstate Aviation Committee is responsible for investigating aviation accidents in Russia. The Investigative Committee of Russia proposed three possible causes of the crash, namely inclement weather, technical failure, or pilot error. On 9 July, the aircraft's flight data recorder (FDR) was found. A spokesman said that "no critical damage" was found during a cursory investigation and that it would be decoded in Moscow. The cockpit voice recorder was recovered the same day, but was too badly damaged, with only fragments of the case being found, and its data could not be retrieved.

On 17 July, Rosaviatsia (the Federal Air Transport Agency), released their first analysis of the FDR. The air traffic controller told the crew they were on a bearing of 340 degrees (north-northwesterly rather than the west-northwest 289 bearing instructed by the NDB procedure). The crew flew the base and final turns, and the FDR did not record any lowering of the landing gear or flaps.

Rosaviatsia recommended, amongst other incidents, that the crash of RA-28715 in 2012 (that also attempted to land at Palana) should be reviewed, to assess the implementation of recommendations for flight safety which had arisen from that accident.

References

External links
 
 Interstate Aviation Committee investigation page: English and Russian
  (no narration or music)
 Cockpit video of an easterly visual approach to Palana, circa 2012 − 2021 crash site is on coastal cliffs seen at the left 
 Article related to the crash via kommersant.ru (original is in Russian, link is auto-translated to English using Google)

2021 disasters in Russia
Accidents and incidents involving the Antonov An-26
Aviation accidents and incidents in 2021
Aviation accidents and incidents in Russia
History of the Kamchatka Peninsula
July 2021 events in Russia
Transport in Kamchatka Krai
Aviation in the Russian Far East